On the Red Dot is a current affairs/info-ed programme formerly hosted by Cheryl Fox and Otelli Edwards. It first aired on Mediacorp Channel 5 on Wednesdays, 9.00pm, beginning October 31, 2012 Repeat telecasts are broadcast on CNA, on Sundays of the same week at 10.30pm. The show examines issues that are close to the hearts of all Singaporeans.

The show revamped for a new look on April 3, 2013.

From January 1, 2015, Channel 5 will air it at a new time, Thursdays at 10.00pm, and the show was revamped for a new look.

Background
The series is a weekly current affairs magazine programme that focuses solely on the little red dot we call home. The show seeks to examine trends, issues and policies that matter to Singaporeans. It seeks to give Singaporeans an in-depth understanding of the context surrounding important issues and events.

Presenters

See also
List of On The Red Dot episodes

References

Current affairs shows
2012 Singaporean television series debuts
Channel 5 (Singapore) original programming
CNA (TV network) original programming